Perses (fl. 750 BC) was the brother of Hesiod.  He is mentioned several times in the Works and Days.  Perses plays the role of Hesiod's less-than-responsible brother, foolishly handling an inheritance given to him by the ruling of unjust judges.

References

Ancient Boeotians
8th-century BC Greek people